Zemke is a surname. Notable people with the surname include:

Adam Zemke (born 1983), American politician
Hubert Zemke (1914–1994), American pilot
Jake Zemke (born 1975), American road racer
Janusz Zemke (born 1949), Polish politician
Jens Zemke (born 1966), German racing cyclist